Khadagi (Kaitag: Хаӏдаӏгъи; Dargwa: Хядягъи) is a rural locality (a selo) in Dzhibakhninsky Selsoviet, Kaytagsky District, Republic of Dagestan, Russia. The population was 183 as of 2010. There are 3 streets.

Geography 
Khadagi is located 16 km southeast of Madzhalis (the district's administrative centre) by road. Kulegu, Dzhinabi and Dzhibakhni are the nearest rural localities.

Nationalities 
Dargins live there.

References 

Rural localities in Kaytagsky District